Cyclobacterium xiamenense  is a horseshoe-shaped, Gram-negative and non-motile bacterium from the genus of Cyclobacterium which has been isolated from the alga Chlorella autotrophica from the coastal sea of Xiamen in China.

References 

Cytophagia
Bacteria described in 2014
Psychrophiles